Rick L. Woods (born November 16, 1959) is an American former professional football player, a defensive back in the National Football League (NFL). He played safety and cornerback for six seasons for the Pittsburgh Steelers (1982–86) and the Tampa Bay Buccaneers (1987).

Born and raised in Boise, Idaho, Woods played football at Boise High School and college football at Boise State, where he was a standout defensive back and punt returner.  He was a member of the I-AA national championship team in 1980, and the 1981 team that reached the national semifinals.  As a punt returner at BSU, he rarely called a fair catch, earning him the nickname "Riverboat Gambler." In the 1982 NFL Draft in late April, Woods was selected in the fourth round (97th overall) by the Steelers.

American football cornerbacks
American football safeties
Boise State Broncos football players
Pittsburgh Steelers players
Tampa Bay Buccaneers players
Players of American football from Idaho
Sportspeople from Boise, Idaho
1959 births
Living people